Sigrgarðs saga ok Valbrands is a medieval Icelandic romance saga.

Synopsis 

Kalinke and Mitchell summarise the saga thus:

Composed in Iceland, presumably in the fourteenth century. Sigrgarðr, son of King Valdimar of England, obtains a magic harp from the dwarf Gestr in exchange for promising to give him his first-born son. He wins Florida, daughter of King Ptolemeus, by defeating Valbrandr, another suitor, at arms and at harp playing. Valbrandr takes revenge first by stabbing Sigrgarðr and then by killing the king in battle. Florida's two sons by Sigrgarðr are thrown into the sea, but one is rescued by a crow. King Valdimar of England frees Florida and her
mother. Fifteen years later a joyful reunion takes place in England when Gestr arrives with the rescued son whom he had raised. Young Sigrgarðr avenges his father's death by killing Valbrandr.

Manuscripts 

Kalinke and Mitchell identified the following manuscripts of the saga:

Two manuscripts are listed by Kalinke and Mitchell as containing Sigurgarðs saga frækna which actually contain Sigurgarðs saga og Valbrands: Lbs 1496 4to (1883) and Lbs 2319 4to (1727-1729). Likewise, Handrit.is lists Lbs 4547 8vo as containing Sigurgarðs saga frækna, also incorrectly.

Editions and translations 

 Agnete Loth (ed.), Late Medieval Icelandic Romances, Editiones Arnamagæanae, series B, 20–24, 5 vols (Copenhagen: Munksgaard, 1962–65), V, 109-94. [The principal scholarly edition.]

References 

Chivalric sagas
Icelandic literature
Old Norse literature